Václav Jírů (31 July 1910 – 28 June 1980) was a Czech photographer and writer. He is known for his photographs of Prague. In 1957, he founded the quarterly photography magazine Fotografie and served as its editor-in-chief until 1972.

Biography
Jírů was born on 31 July 1910 in Doubravany in Austria-Hungary (now part of Košík in the Czech Republic). He began his career as a writer and journalist, and his first photographs were published in 1927. Over the next decade Jírů published in the Czech magazines Světozor and Pestrý týden, as well as foreign magazines such as Picture Post and Lilliput. His subjects were diverse, including sporting events, theatre portraits, landscapes, and nudes. During World War II, he was arrested by the Gestapo on 22 February 1940 and sentenced to death for participating in the resistance movement against the German occupation of Czechoslovakia. The following year his sentence was commuted to life imprisonment, and he remained in several concentration camps, including the prison in Hamelin, until the end of the war in 1945.
 
After the war, he wrote Šesté jaro [Sixth Spring], a 252-page book describing the years he spent in prison and containing photographs that he took shortly after liberation. The book was published in 1946. A reviewer for Books Abroad wrote that Jírů's "sketchy, staccato manner is well fitted to a vigorous account of his six horrible years under the Nazis". He continued to work on several books and photography collections in the late 1940s: Raf (1947), Slunečné pobřeží Jugoslavie [The Sunny Coast of Yugoslavia] (1948), and Zrcadlo života [The Mirror of Life] (1949). During this time, he was active in several regional artists' groups and was known for his photographs of Prague.
 
Jírů worked at the socialist photography magazine Nová fotografie from 1950 until it stopped publication in 1952. In 1957, he founded Fotografie, an influential quarterly magazine featuring works by both Czech and foreign photographers, reviews, and news items.
 
Jírů died in Prague on 28 June 1980, at the age of 69. His work is included in the collections of the Moravian Gallery in Brno, the Museum Folkwang, the Museum of Decorative Arts in Prague, the Museum of Fine Arts Houston, and more.

References

 

 

1910 births
1980 deaths
20th-century Czech writers
Czech male writers
Czech resistance members
Czech editors
Czech magazine editors
People from Nymburk District
Prisoners of Nazi concentration camps
Nude photography